Fairmount is an unincorporated community in Leavenworth County, Kansas, United States.  It is part of the Kansas City metropolitan area, and located north of the city of Basehor.

History
Fairmount was platted in 1867. In 1912, Fairmount contained four stores and one factory. The Fairmount post office closed in 1934. 

Currently, Fairmount contains several housing suburbs, near the city limits of Lake Quivira, Bonner Springs, Basehor, and the neighborhood of Piper in Kansas City, Kansas. It’s fire and medical services are provided by Fairmount Township Fire and Rescue the Kansas City Kansas Fire Department. Policing services are provided by the Leavenworth and Wyandotte County Sheriff’s Office, and the Basehor Police Department.

Education
The community is served by Lansing USD 469 and Basehor–Linwood USD 458 public school districts.  USD 469 serves northern Fairmount, USD 458 serves southern Fairmount.

References

Further reading

External links
 Leavenworth County maps: Current, Historic, KDOT

Unincorporated communities in Leavenworth County, Kansas
Unincorporated communities in Kansas